Paweł Giżycki (1692 – 1762) was a Polish Jesuit architect who worked in eastern regions of the Polish–Lithuanian Commonwealth (mainly in the Crown of the Kingdom of Poland).

Giżycki was born in Greater Poland on 21 January 1692. His exact place of birth is unknown. He was admitted into the Society of Jesus in Kraków on 16 July 1710. In 1712–1713 he taught grammar in Piotrków. In 1713–1716 he studied philosophy in Lublin College and until 1719 lectured in Lwów, Sambor and Sandomierz. Between 1719 and 1923, he studied theology in Sandomierz and Kraków. It is during this period that Giżycki likely received his architectural education at Kacper Bażanka's workshop, and perhaps participated in the reconstruction of the burnt Kraków College. After graduation, he was sent on mission to parishes of Biała, Jordanów and Żywiec. His first known architectural work was the main altar of Żywiec parish church, dated to 1724. Giżycki died on 28 January 1762 in Krzemieniec, Polish–Lithuanian Commonwealth (now Kremenets, Ukraine).

Works and projects

 Castrum doloris of Paweł Karol Sanguszko in Kapucyn Church in Lublin and his tombstone in Lubartów 
 Saint Ignatius of Loyola church in Kremenets (1730-1746) 
 Stanisław Węcławowicz palace in Burbiszki near Vilnius 
 Church and Monastery in Jurewicze
 Jesuit Church in Sambor/Sambir (c. 1730)
 Stanisław Wincenty Jabłonowski's palace (early 1740s)
 Pauline Church in Niżniów/Nyzhniv (early 1740s)
 altar of  St. Stanislaus Kostka (project) in St. John Church in Jarosław )
 Reformed Church in Dederkały Wielkie
 tower of Dominican Church in Podkamień/Pidkamin
 Jesuit church in Stanisławów (now Greek Catholic Church of Holy Resurrection in Ivano-Frankivsk) (attributed)
 Bernardine Church and Monastery in Łuck (now Holy Trinity Orthodox Cathedral in Lutsk) 
 Jesuit Church in Poryck, 1743-1755 (no longer existing)

References

Bibliography
 
 
 

18th-century Polish Jesuits
Polish Baroque architects
Ukrainian Baroque architects
1692 births
1762 deaths